Horsebreaker Star is the third solo album by Grant McLennan, a member of The Go-Betweens. McLennan recorded the album in Athens, Georgia with American musicians. It was also the only ever double album associated with the Go-Betweens. In a 1995 interview he said the album had been "a lot of work".

"I wanted it to be the kind of record that could be played by anyone, but not too obvious. You know, the London Symphony Orchestra doesn't have to do the ballads, Johnny Cash doesn't have to do the country songs. I don't like to be that predictable. I like surprises," he said.

McLennan toured the US, Europe and Australia in 1995 to promote the album, playing with musicians including Anna Burley and Dave Foley from The Killjoys, and Phil Kakulas from Blackeyed Susans. His American performances received highly favourable reviews from The New York Times and Rolling Stone, which called McLennan "one of the world's great songwriters".

This was the first of his solo albums credited to "Grant", rather than "G.W." as on the previous two.

The single-disc American release stripped off six songs — "Late Afternoon in Early August" and "Ballad of Easy Rider" from the first disc and "Do Your Own Thing" through "Head Over Heels" from the second — while adding on "Lighting Fires" from Fireboy. Neither version sold well.

Track listing
All tracks written by Grant McLennan, except where noted.
Disc one
 "Simone & Perry" – 4:09
 "Ice in Heaven" – 4:22
 "What Went Wrong" – 8:11
 "Race Day Rag" – 2:03
 "Don't You Cry For Me No More" – 3:06
 "Put You Down" – 4:46
 "Late Afternoon in Early August" – 2:47
 "Coming Up For Air" – 3:43
 "Ballad of Easy Rider" (Roger McGuinn) – 3:48
 "Open Invitation" – 4:53
 "Open My Eyes" – 3:22
 "From My Lips" – 2:31

Disc two
 "Dropping You" – 3:16
 "Hot Water" – 3:47
 "Keep My Word" – 3:28
 "Do Your Own Thing" – 2:58
 "That's That" – 3:23
 "If I Was a Girl" – 6:01
 "Head Over Heels" – 2:47
 "Girl in a Beret" – 4:31
 "All Her Songs" – 4:12
 "No Peace in the Palace" – 4:15
 "I'll Call You Wild" – 4:41
 "Horsebreaker Star" – 4:13

Personnel
 Grant McLennan – guitars, vibes, vocals
 John Keane – guitars, banjo, keyboards, bass, xylophone, percussion, backing vocals
 Joel Morris – drums
 Steve Venz – bass
 Andy Carlson – strings, electric guitar, mandolin
 Tim White – organ, piano
 Bill Holmes – organ, piano
 Dwight Manning – oboe
 Syd Straw – backing vocals
 Esta Hill – backing vocals ("Put You Down")

References

1994 albums
Grant McLennan albums
Albums produced by John Keane (record producer)
Beggars Banquet Records albums